Desmond Coe (born 22 November 1958) is a shooting competitor for New Zealand. At the 1998 Commonwealth Games he won the bronze medal in the Trap event. He has competed at one Olympic Games; the 2000 Summer Olympics in Sydney.

References

1958 births
Living people
New Zealand male sport shooters
Olympic shooters of New Zealand
Commonwealth Games bronze medallists for New Zealand
Shooters at the 2000 Summer Olympics
Shooters at the 1998 Commonwealth Games
Commonwealth Games medallists in shooting
20th-century New Zealand people
21st-century New Zealand people
Medallists at the 1998 Commonwealth Games